ESPI may refer to:

 Electronic speckle pattern interferometry
 Enhanced Serial Peripheral Interface Bus (eSPI), a synchronous serial communication protocol